Malik Noor Saleem Khan (born 9 March 1972) is a Pakistani politician from Lakki Marwat District who was a member of the Khyber Pakhtunkhwa Assembly from 2013 to 2018. He belongs to the Jamiat Ulema-e-Islam (F). He also served as chairman and member of the different committees.

Early life and education
Khan was born on 9 March 1972 in Karachi, he got his BSc degree in Business studies from Nottingham Trent University and Master of Business Administration from Boston University.

Political career
Khan was elected as the member of the Khyber Pakhtunkhwa Assembly on ticket of Jamiat Ulema-e-Islam (F) from PK-75 (Lakki Marwat-II) in 2013 Pakistani general election.

References

1972 births
Living people
Pashtun people
Jamiat Ulema-e-Islam (F) politicians
Khyber Pakhtunkhwa MPAs 2013–2018
People from Lakki Marwat District
Alumni of Nottingham Trent University
Boston University School of Management alumni